Los Pincheira (The Pincheiras) is a 2004 Chilean historic telenovela developed and broadcast by TVN and directed by Vicente Sabatini. The series was based in the story of the Pincheira brothers.

Plot
The telenovela centers in 1918 (One hundred years after the actual events happened). Delfín and Miguel Molina were accused accomplices of his father, who was unjustly accused. This accusation was made by Mrs. Carmen, Olegario Sotomayor's mother. The father of the Molina was shot after the murder charge . From there, both brothers, in charge of his younger brothers Santiago and Trinidad Molina Molina, had to make to live in anonymity as police sought. Subsequently, the charge included Santiago Molina, so far, the three men were brothers guilty of unlawful killing. In one chapter, are shown Delfín and Miguel young with his father in a state of poor health. On stage, their father asked to care for siblings. This explains the enormous commitment of Miguel for taking care of younger siblings, especially Trinidad.

Once the murder occurred alongside Molina brothers and sister Pancrazio (helpers of the old Molina family) escaped through the woods until you find a cave, which became his home. Looting for food began to be daily, until officially, the band "The Pincheira" began to fight for justice for the death of his father.

Cast

References

2004 telenovelas
Chilean telenovelas
2004 Chilean television series debuts
2004 Chilean television series endings
Televisión Nacional de Chile telenovelas
Spanish-language telenovelas